The Gumball Rally is a 1976 American comedy film directed and co-written by Charles Bail, a former stunt coordinator also known as Chuck Bail, about an illicit coast-to-coast road race. It was inspired by the Cannonball Baker Sea-To-Shining-Sea Memorial Trophy Dash run by Brock Yates, which inspired several other films, including Cannonball (1976), Cannonball Run (1981), and Speed Zone (1989), as well as an actual event, the American Gumball Rally and Gumball 3000 international race.

Plot
Michael Bannon (Michael Sarrazin), a wealthy but bored businessman and candymaker, issues the code word "Gumball" to his fellow automobile enthusiasts, who gather in a garage in New York City to embark on a coast-to-coast race "with no catalytic converter and no 55-mile-per-hour speed limit" in the shortest amount of time. There is only one rule: "There are no rules".

Their longtime nemesis, Los Angeles Police Department Lieutenant Roscoe (Normann Burton), who has been trying for years to arrest Bannon and his group, has flown in specially to attempt to shut down the race. He is unsuccessful, and the race begins early the next morning in spite of his momentary interference. Most of the film is devoted to the adventures of the various driving teams and Roscoe's ineffectual attempts to apprehend them.

A number of running gags ensue – the Jaguar that will not start (and never even makes it off the Starting Line); the silent (and somewhat-psychotic) motorcyclist Lapchik's (Harvey Jason) numerous mishaps; Italian race driver Franco Bertollini's (Raúl Juliá) frequent detours to seduce beautiful women – as well as some stunts and driving sequences, including the first moving car into moving tractor-trailer stunt later to become a trademark of Knight Rider, and a race in the Los Angeles River at the same location where Greased Lightning would defeat the Scorpions' Mercury in Grease. The race ends at the Queen Mary in Long Beach, California where the finishers celebrate their arrival and the defeated Roscoe sulks off to one side – until a fleet of police cars and tow trucks, summoned by Roscoe, arrive to impound the Gumball vehicles. Roscoe had contrived a plan to see to it that all of them were guaranteed to be illegally parked once the post-race party in the parking lot ran past 11 PM.

Bannon congratulates Roscoe on his final victory (final because Roscoe, who has been after Bannon and Smith since they were in high school, has reached mandatory retirement age). Contemplating how they will all return home without cars, he again utters the word "Gumball" to the assembled group to indicate a race back to New York. Lapchik, the last contestant to finish the race, roars through the Parking Lot with a stuck throttle and is launched out into the water.

Cast & vehicles
 Michael Sarrazin as Michael Bannon - AC Cobra
 Nicholas Pryor as Professor Samuel Graves - AC Cobra
 Tim McIntire as Steve Smith - Ferrari Daytona
 Raúl Juliá as Franco Bertollini - Ferrari Daytona
 Norman Burton as Lieutenant Roscoe, LAPD
 John Durren as Ace "Mr. Guts" Preston - Camaro Z-28
 Gary Busey as Gibson, Preston's Co-Driver and Mechanic - Chevrolet Camaro Z-28
 Joanne Nail as Jane Johnson - Porsche 911
 Susan Flannery as Alice Johnson - Porsche 911
 J. Pat O'Malley as Barney Donahue - Mercedes-Benz 300 SL
 Vaughn Taylor as Andy McAllister - Mercedes-Benz 300SL
 Lazaro Perez as Jose - Rolls-Royce Silver Shadow
 Tricia O'Neil as Angie - Rolls-Royce Silver Shadow
 Harvey Jason as Lapchik "The Mad Hungarian - Kawasaki KH400 Motorcycle
 Steven Keats as Kandinsky - Dodge Polara Police Car
 Wally Taylor as Avila - Dodge Polara Police Car
 Eddy Donno as Mel Donno - Chevy Van
 Dick Karie as Joe Karie - Chevrolet Van
 Alfred Shelly as Harry Shelly - Chevrolet Van
 Whitey Hughes as Hughes - Chevrolet Corvette
 Larry Silvestri as Silvestri - Chevrolet Corvette
 Wes Dawn as Mullin - Jaguar E-Type
 John Morton as "Tulip" - Jaguar E-Type
 Stephen Blood as "Rabbit" - Hot Rod
 Linda Vaughn as Emergency Plan Alpha
 Walter R. Smith as Police Officer
 John Lawlor as Alice Johnson's Husband

Race results
 AC Cobra: First place.
 Ferrari Daytona: Second place.
 Porsche 911: Completed race. Third place by parking of cars.
 Dodge Polara: Completed race.
 Mercedes 300 SL Roadster: Completed race.
 Kawasaki Motorcycle: Completed race. Last competitor to finish.
 Camaro: Did not finish. Wrecked on LA Freeway.
 Chevrolet Van: Did not finish. Caught fire and wrecked in fireworks factory.
 Corvette: Did not finish. Wrecked in New York City.
 Jaguar XKE: Did not finish. Failed to start and never crossed the starting line.
 Rolls-Royce: Not an official entry. Did not finish. Delivered to owner in Beverly Hills; brakes failed in driveway and Rolls crashed into pickup truck.

Production
Most of the filming took place in Arizona. Opening scenes of the race were filmed in downtown New York City early on a Sunday morning on closed roads (including Broadway and Park Avenue). The George Washington Bridge and Lincoln Tunnel was used for the exit from New York into New Jersey. The final duel between the Cobra and Ferrari was filmed at (and in) the Los Angeles River and the closing scene was shot at the Queen Mary in Long Beach.  Additional filming was done in the City of Orange, California, specifically around the downtown Plaza area (approximately 1:07 - 1:10).

References

External links
 
 
 
 

1976 films
1970s action comedy films
1970s comedy road movies
American action comedy films
American comedy road movies
American auto racing films
Warner Bros. films
First Artists films
Films scored by Dominic Frontiere
Films set in Boston
Films set in Connecticut
Films set in Illinois
Films set in New York City
Films set in North Carolina
Films set in Long Beach, California
Films set in Los Angeles
Films set in Oklahoma
Films set in Pennsylvania
Films set in Santa Barbara, California
1976 comedy films
1970s English-language films
Films directed by Charles Bail
1970s American films